Douglas Rodríguez (June 3, 1950 – May 21, 2012 in Havana) was an amateur boxer from Cuba, who represented his native country in the Men's Flyweight (– 51 kg) category at the 1972 Summer Olympics in Munich, West Germany.

There he won the bronze medal after being stopped in the semifinals by Uganda's eventual silver medalist Leo Rwabwogo. Rodríguez claimed the first ever world title in his weight division by defeating Venezuela's Alfredo Pérez in the final of the 1974 World Amateur Boxing Championships in Havana, Cuba.

Rodríguez's death was confirmed on May 21, 2012.  He  had suffered a heart attack at his home in Cuba. He was 61.

References

1950 births
2012 deaths
Sportspeople from Santiago de Cuba
Flyweight boxers
Boxers at the 1972 Summer Olympics
Olympic boxers of Cuba
Olympic bronze medalists for Cuba
Olympic medalists in boxing
Cuban male boxers
AIBA World Boxing Championships medalists
Medalists at the 1972 Summer Olympics
Boxers at the 1971 Pan American Games
Pan American Games bronze medalists for Cuba
Pan American Games medalists in boxing
Medalists at the 1971 Pan American Games